Jesús Villegas (born 23 August 1946) is a Colombian hurdler. He competed in the men's 400 metres hurdles at the 1976 Summer Olympics.

References

1946 births
Living people
Athletes (track and field) at the 1975 Pan American Games
Athletes (track and field) at the 1976 Summer Olympics
Colombian male hurdlers
Olympic athletes of Colombia
Place of birth missing (living people)
Pan American Games competitors for Colombia
20th-century Colombian people